Wojcieszków is a village in Łuków County, Lublin Voivodeship, in eastern Poland. It is the seat of the gmina (administrative district) called Gmina Wojcieszków. The village has a population of 1,100, and was a town from 1540 to 1819.

History
The village of Wojcieszkow was founded in 1437 by a local nobleman Klemens Bielinski. In the same year, Bishop of Kraków Zbigniew Olesnicki established a Roman Catholic parish church here. On January 21, 1540, upon request of Mikolaj Dzik, the owner of Wojcieszkow, King Sigismund I Old granted Magdeburg rights to it.

In 1767, a wooden church of Holy Trinity was built, and in 1771, a Suchodolski family library was opened. Until the Partitions of Poland, Wojcieszkow belonged to the County of Stezyca, Sandomierz Voivodeship.

In the late 18th century, the Plater family built a large manor house, which was burned during World War II. According to documents, in 1802 Wojcieszkow had a marketplace, a church, and a castle. The town, however, was on poor soil, among forests and sands, which had a negative impact on its development. As a result, Wojcieszkow gradually declined and, in 1819, was stripped of its town charter.

Today
The location of Wojcieszkow turned out to be an advantage. Due to its clean environment, hilly landscape and forests, the village is emerging as a local tourist center. It has a historic church and a cemetery, where Maria Babska, the wife of Henryk Sienkiewicz, is buried.

References

Villages in Łuków County
Lesser Poland
Siedlce Governorate
Lublin Governorate
Lublin Voivodeship (1919–1939)